Piero Matías Campos Moreno (born 28 January 1992) is a Chilean footballer.

His last club was Deportes Temuco.

Honours

Player
Deportes Temuco
 Primera B (1): 2015–16

References
 
 

1992 births
Living people
Chilean footballers
Unión Temuco footballers
O'Higgins F.C. footballers
Deportes Temuco footballers
Chilean Primera División players
Primera B de Chile players
Association football forwards
People from Rancagua